Ceuta Ya! (literally "Ceuta Now!") is a Spanish political party in Ceuta. The party is left-wing and localist.

The party was launched on 15 October 2021 by Mohamed Mustafa as a successor to the Caballas Coalition. On 23 November, after the resignation of former Caballas leader Mohamed Alí, Mustafa was sworn in as his replacement in the Assembly of Ceuta.

The party supports the elevation of Ceuta from an autonomous city to a full autonomous community, a policy also held by its predecessor. At its launch, party figures spoke of uniting the people of Ceuta against what they considered to be divisive politics of nationwide parties, particularly Vox.

References

2021 establishments in Spain
Political parties established in 2021
Political parties in Ceuta
Berbers in Spain
Regionalist parties in Spain